Richard Harris (1930–2002) was an Irish actor, singer, theatrical producer, film director and writer.

Richard Harris may also refer to:

Politicians 
 Richard Harris (1777–1854), British Radical politician
 Dick Harris (born 1944), Canadian politician
 Richard Reader Harris (politician) (1913–2009), British Conservative politician

Entertainers 
 Richard Harris (composer) (born 1968), British composer, teacher and pianist
 Richard Harris (television writer) (born 1934), British television writer
 Richard Harris, member of doo-wop group The Marcels
 Richard A. Harris, American film editor
 Ricky Harris (1962–2016), American producer, actor and comedian
 Richard Rankin (born 1983), Scottish actor and comedian, born Richard Harris

Sportspeople
 Dick Harris (American football) (born 1937), former American football defensive back
 Dick Harris (Australian rules footballer) (1911–1993), Australian rules footballer
 Dick L. Harris (1885–1945), Australian rules footballer
 Dickie Harris (born 1950), American football player in the CFL
 Richard Harris (American football) (1948–2011), former NFL player and CFL coach
 Richard Harris (baseball), Negro league baseball player
 Richard Harris (footballer) (born 1980), English former footballer
 Rick Harris (born 1948), American wrestler known as Black Bart

Other people 
 J. Richard Harris (born 1910), Irish entomologist, fishing consultant and tackle merchant, and author
 Richard Harris (anaesthetist), cave diver involved in the Tham Luang cave rescue
 Richard Harris (college principal), principal of Brasenose College, Oxford, 1573–1595
 Richard Harris (prospector) (1833–1907), Canadian miner and prospector
 Richard Reader Harris (barrister) (1847–1909), English barrister, counselor to Queen Victoria, Methodist minister
 Richard Deodatus Poulett-Harris (1817–1899), English/Australian educator

See also
 Richard Harries, Baron Harries of Pentregarth (born 1936), former Anglican Bishop of Oxford and broadcaster